Daniel Rinner (born 11 November 1990 in Vaduz) is a Liechtensteiner former professional cyclist.

Major results

2007
 National Road Championships
2nd Road race
2nd Time trial
2008
 2nd Time trial, National Road Championships
 8th Overall Mainfranken-Tour
2010
 National Road Championships
1st Road race
1st Time trial
2011
 3rd Time trial, National Road Championships
2012
 National Road Championships
1st Road race
2nd Time trial

References

External links

1990 births
Living people
Liechtenstein male cyclists
People from Vaduz